Dwight Wheeler (born January 13, 1955) is an American former football offensive tackle who played in the NFL from 1978 to 1988.

References

1955 births
Living people
American football offensive linemen
Tennessee State Tigers football players
New England Patriots players
Los Angeles Raiders players
San Diego Chargers players